The Daily News – Antelope Valley was an edition of the Los Angeles Daily News, with offices in  Palmdale, California, United States. At one time the publication was the area's second largest circulating daily newspaper. It was owned by the Los Angeles Newspaper Group, whose flagship publication is the Los Angeles Daily News.

Like the L.A. Daily News, the paper is center-right in political orientation. The Antelope Valley's other major newspaper, the Antelope Valley Press, is also center-right, making Palmdale unique among California's major cities, whose dailies usually tilt left.

The local edition was no longer in publication in 2017.

External links
Daily News Website

Mass media in Palmdale, California
Daily newspapers published in Greater Los Angeles
Digital First Media
MediaNews Group